The Las Palmas de Gran Canaria International Film Festival is an international film festival that is held in Las Palmas in the island of Gran Canaria in the Canary Islands. The festival takes place every year. It was first held in 2000.

The festival is held in several venues in the city.. In 2015 the Palacete Rodriguez Quegles became the base for the festival.

Winners of the Lady Harimaguada de Oro

References

External links

Tourist attractions in Las Palmas
Canarian culture
Film festivals in Spain
2000 establishments in Spain
Recurring events established in 2000